Unione Calcio Sampdoria bounced back from a disappointing season the year before, and scored the most goals of all teams on its way to third in Serie A. It also won Coppa Italia following a furious second-half offensive against Ancona, winning both the match and on aggregate with a commanding 6–1.

The most influential players were experienced duo Ruud Gullit and Roberto Mancini combined with playmakers David Platt and Attilio Lombardo, with Sampdoria's strength lying in the offensive department. Nevertheless, the entire team was filled with internationally recognised players, even though the defence was nowhere close to the efficiency of league champions A.C. Milan.

Players

Transfers

Competitions

Serie A

League table

Results by round

Matches

Coppa Italia

Second round

Round of 16

Quarter-finals

Semifinals

Final

Statistics

Players statistics

Goalscorers
  Ruud Gullit 15
  Roberto Mancini 12
  David Platt 9
  Attilio Lombardo 8
  Vladimir Jugović 6

References

U.C. Sampdoria seasons
Sampdoria